Division No. 1 is one of eighteen census divisions in the province of Saskatchewan, Canada, as defined by Statistics Canada. It is located in the southeast corner of the province, bordering Manitoba and North Dakota. The most populous community in this division is Estevan.

Demographics 

Census subdivisions 
The following census subdivisions (municipalities or municipal equivalents) are located within Saskatchewan's Division No. 1.

Cities
Estevan

Towns
Alameda
Arcola
Bienfait
Carlyle
Carnduff
Lampman
Oxbow
Redvers
Stoughton
Wawota

Villages

Alida
Carievale
Fairlight
Forget
Frobisher
Gainsborough
Glen Ewen
Heward
Kennedy
Kenosee Lake
Kisbey
Manor
Maryfield
North Portal
Roche Percée
Storthoaks

Rural municipalities

RM No. 1 Argyle
RM No. 2 Mount Pleasant
RM No. 3 Enniskillen
RM No. 4 Coalfields
RM No. 5 Estevan
RM No. 31 Storthoaks
RM No. 32 Reciprocity
RM No. 33 Moose Creek
RM No. 34 Browning
RM No. 35 Benson
RM No. 61 Antler
RM No. 63 Moose Mountain
RM No. 64 Brock
RM No. 65 Tecumseh
RM No. 91 Maryfield
RM No. 92 Walpole
RM No. 93 Wawken
RM No. 94 Hazelwood
RM No. 95 Golden West

Indian reserves

 Ocean Man First Nation
 Ocean Man 69
 Ocean Man 69A
 Ocean Man 69B
 Ocean Man 69C
 Ocean Man 69E
 Ocean Man 69F
 Ocean Man 69G
 Ocean Man 69H
 Ocean Man 69I
 Pheasant Rump Nakota First Nation
 Pheasant Rump 68
 White Bear First Nation
 White Bear 70

See also 
List of census divisions of Saskatchewan
List of communities in Saskatchewan

References

 
01